Veljko Vlahović (Cyrillic: Вељко Влаховић; 2 September 1914 – 7 March 1975) was a Montenegrin politician and career army officer. He was one of the more prominent members of the Montenegrin branch of the Yugoslav Communist Party from 1935 which established the SFR Yugoslavia following World War II. He studied in Belgrade, Prague, and the Sorbonne (in Paris), and finished his postgraduate studies in Moscow. He fought in the Spanish Civil War and was active in organizing the Communist Youth League of Yugoslavia (SKOJ). 

During World War II he directed the Free Yugoslavia radio. In 1944 he became editor of the Yugoslav communist daily, Borba. He also served as deputy Foreign Minister.

Vlahović was essential in organizing the documents for the Programme of the League of Communists of Yugoslavia (Program Saveza komunista Jugoslavije, also known as the Ljubljana Programme, which laid the principles of Titoism) and the 10th Congress of the Party, both in 1958. As such, he kept a great authority alongside Josip Broz Tito as an ideological mastermind.

References

See also
 Socialist Federal Republic of Yugoslavia
 Titoism

1914 births
1975 deaths
Politicians from Podgorica
University of Paris alumni
University of Belgrade alumni
Yugoslav Partisans members
Yugoslav people of the Spanish Civil War
Recipients of the Order of the People's Hero
League of Communists of Montenegro politicians
Czech Technical University in Prague alumni
Montenegrin communists
International Brigades personnel
Generals of the Yugoslav People's Army
Burials at Belgrade New Cemetery
Recipients of the Order of the Hero of Socialist Labour